Miguel Ângelo Silva Mota Faria (born 20 March 1995) simply Miguel Ângelo, is a Portuguese footballer who plays for Montalegre as a forward.

Football career
On 23 May 2015, Miguel Ângelo made his professional debut with Leixões in a 2014–15 Segunda Liga match against Portimonense.

References

External links
Stats and profile at Zerozero

Stats and profile at LPFP 

1995 births
Footballers from Porto
Living people
Portuguese footballers
Association football forwards
Liga Portugal 2 players
Leixões S.C. players
S.C. Salgueiros players
S.C. Freamunde players
Leça F.C. players
Anadia F.C. players
Gondomar S.C. players
C.D.C. Montalegre players